Matt Treacy is an Irish historian and writer.  Treacy was a member of the Provisional IRA, and spent four years in Portlaoise Prison before being released under the Good Friday Agreement. He worked with a number of Sinn Féin politicians as an advisor and speechwriter, including Martin Ferris TD. Treacy studied and completed a PhD in Trinity College Dublin. Treacy has written histories of the IRA and the Communist Party of Ireland. Treacy contributed a column to An Phoblacht, reporting on Gaelic football and hurling, and works as a freelance journalist.

Publications
 The Communist Party of Ireland 1921 - 2011, by Matt Treacy, Brocaire Books, 2012.
 A  Tunnel to the Moon:  The End of the Irish Republican Army, by Matt Treacy, Lulu Publishing, 2011.
 The IRA 1956–69: Rethinking the Republic, by Matt Treacy, Manchester University Press, 2013.
 A Year of the Dubs, by Matt Treacy, Lulu Publishing, 2013.
 Houses of Pain, by Matt Treacy, MTP Publishing, 2020.

References

Living people
Provisional Irish Republican Army members
Irish republicans
Irish republicans imprisoned on charges of terrorism
Alumni of Trinity College Dublin
Year of birth missing (living people)